Taeniogyrus dunedinensis, commonly known as the burrowing sea cucumber, is a small sea cucumber from New Zealand.

Description 
Taeniogyrus dunedinensis is named after Dunedin, the city in which it was first identified by Thomas Parker, and was first called Chirodota dunedinensis. It has one subspecies, Taeniogyrus dunedinensis microurna (Mortensen, 1925).

He also described small red spots on the body which disappear when placed in spirit, and dark spots on the inner side of the tentacles, which are not affected by spirit.

Distribution 
T. dunedinensis is found in the littoral zone, around the coast of New Zealand, including the Auckland and Chatham Islands.

References 

Marine fauna of New Zealand
Animals described in 1881
Chiridotidae